List of Tench-class submarines and their dispositions. 29 of these boats were built during and after World War II, commissioned from October 1944 through February 1951, with 11 commissioned postwar. None of this class were lost in World War II. Ghazi (ex-Diablo (SS-479)) was lost in Pakistani service on 4 December 1971 during the Indo-Pakistani Naval War of 1971, possibly due to an accident  Some of the class served actively in the US Navy through the middle 1970s, others served into the 1990s with foreign navies, and one (Hai Shih ex-) is still active in Taiwan's Republic of China Navy.

This, combined with less wartime service than previous classes, led to these classes being preferred for modernization programs and active postwar service. 16 Tenches were modernized under various GUPPY conversion programs, plus 8 received the more austere "Fleet Snorkel" modernization.

Cancellations
A total of 125 U.S. submarines were cancelled during World War II, all but three between 29 July 1944 and 12 August 1945. References vary considerably as to how many of these were Balaos and how many were Tenches. This yields 10 cancelled Balao-class, SS-353-360 and 379-380. The Register of Ships of the U. S. Navy differs, considering every submarine not specifically ordered as a Tench to be a Balao, and further projecting SS-551-562 as a future class. This yields 62 cancelled Balao class, 51 cancelled Tench class, and 12 cancelled SS-551 class. This article follows the information in the "Register". The cancelled hull numbers, including those launched incomplete, were SS-353-360 (Balao), 379–380 (Balao), 427–434 (Balao), 436–437 (Tench), 438–474 (Balao), 491–521 (Tench), 526-529 (Tench), 530–536 (Balao), 537-550 (Tench), and 551-562 (SS-551 class).

Abbreviations
Abbreviations and hull classification symbols for postwar redesignations/conversions:
 AGSS — auxiliary submarine (various roles including sonar testing and some pierside trainers)
 FS — "fleet snorkel" conversion, including a snorkel and streamlined sail
 G IA, G II, etc. — various GUPPY conversions, usually including a snorkel, streamlined sail, improved batteries, and upgraded sonar and electronics
 IXSS — unclassified submarine
 PT — pierside trainer for naval reservists, reportedly immobilized by removing the propellers
 SSR — radar picket submarine
 Struck — Struck (deleted) from the Naval Vessel Register, usually followed by scrapping or other final disposal, or sale to a foreign navy

Ships in class

See also
 List of Gato-class submarines
 List of Balao-class submarines

References

Further reading

External links 

 Description of GUPPY conversions at RNSubs.co.uk
 GUPPY and other diesel boat conversions page (partial archive)
 Navsource.org fleet submarines photo and data index page

 
Tench
Tench